The 2016–17 Celta de Vigo season was the club's 93rd season in its history and its 51st participating in La Liga, the top-flight of Spanish football.

Squad

First team squad
.

Out on loan

Transfers

In

Out

Loan out

Pre-season and friendlies

Competitions

Overall

Overview

La Liga

League table

Results summary

Result round by round

Matches

Copa del Rey

Round of 32

Round of 16

Quarter-finals

Semi-finals

UEFA Europa League

Group stage

Knockout phase

Round of 32

Round of 16

Quarter-finals

Semi-finals

Statistics

Appearances and goals
Last updated on 21 May 2017.

|-
! colspan=14 style=background:#dcdcdc; text-align:center|Goalkeepers

|-
! colspan=14 style=background:#dcdcdc; text-align:center|Defenders

|-
! colspan=14 style=background:#dcdcdc; text-align:center|Midfielders

|-
! colspan=14 style=background:#dcdcdc; text-align:center|Forwards

|-
! colspan=14 style=background:#dcdcdc; text-align:center| Players who have made an appearance or had a squad number this season but have left the club
|-

|}

References

External links
Club's official website

Celta de Vigo
RC Celta de Vigo seasons
Celta de Vigo